Arend van der Wel (28 March 1933 – 16 September 2013) was a Dutch professional footballer who played for Ajax and SC Enschede; he also worked as a scout and a coach at FC Twente. He also worked with amateur club DOS '19 and the Royal Dutch Football Association, and for his work in football he was made a Knight of the Order of Orange-Nassau.

References

1933 births
2013 deaths
Dutch footballers
AFC Ajax players
Knights of the Order of Orange-Nassau
Footballers from Amsterdam
AVV De Volewijckers players
Sportclub Enschede players
SC Cambuur players
Association football forwards
HVV Tubantia players